Neural Networks is a monthly, peer-reviewed, scientific journal and an official journal of the International Neural Network Society, European Neural Network Society, and Japanese Neural Network Society.

History 
Neural Networks was established in 1988 and is published by Elsevier. The journal covers all aspects of research on artificial neural networks. The founding editor-in-chief was Stephen Grossberg (Boston University).

The current editors-in-chief are DeLiang Wang (Ohio State University) and Taro Toyoizumi (RIKEN Center for Brain Science).

Abstracting and indexing 
The journal is abstracted and indexed in Scopus and the Science Citation Index. According to the Journal Citation Reports, Neural Networks has a 2021 impact factor of 9.657.

References

External links 
 

Artificial neural networks
Artificial intelligence publications
Elsevier academic journals
Publications established in 1988
Computer science journals
Monthly journals